The 2015 Tandridge District Council election took place on 7 May 2015 to elect one third of members to Tandridge District Council in England coinciding with other local elections held simultaneously with a General Election which resulted in increased turnout compared to the election four years before.  Elections in each ward, depending on size are held in two or three years out of four.

Results
Conservatives gained two seats, adding to councillors within the group with overall control of the Council.

Ward results

An asterisk * indicates an incumbent seeking re-election.

References

2015 English local elections
May 2015 events in the United Kingdom
2015
2010s in Surrey